Sophia was launched at Quebec in 1826 and sailed to London.  In 1830 she became a whaler in the British southern whale fishery and burnt in the Seychelles in March 1833.

Career
She was re-registered in London on 16 March 1827. Sophia first appeared in the Register of Shipping (RS) in 1827. She initially sailed as a West Indiaman and to the Gulf of Mexico.

Whaling voyage and loss
Sophia sailed from London on 18 December 1830, bound for the Seychelles.

In late 1832 Sophia, Acock, master, was at  where she found and killed two whales. Her first and second mates went in pursuit of some whales in two boats, but never returned to Sophia. Captain Acock cruised the vicinity for four days, but without being able to find the missing two officers and 10 men. He then called in at Table Bay on 28 December to recruit a replacement crew.

On 16 March 1833 a fire destroyed Sophia off the Seychelles. Her crew were rescued. She had about 1000 barrels of whale oil on board at the time of her loss. The crew arrived at Trois Freres. French sources state that the whaler Sophia, Hencoc, master, burned about 28 leagues from Silhouette Island. The crew saved themselves by taking to her boats and landing there.

Citations

1826 ships
Ships built in Canada
Age of Sail merchant ships of England
Whaling ships
Maritime incidents in March 1833